Cocosuma is an indie pop band from Paris. Their albums, published at Third Side Records, have garnered both critical and public acclaim. Some of their tracks are picked for lounge or trip hop compilations. Cocosuma gained some fame in 2005 with the French mini-series Clara Sheller, in which their song The Servant played through the end credits.

Band history
Cocosuma's first lead singer was Jen h.ka (I Refuse to Grow). Then, Kacey, the new singer, decided to leave the trio after the second album. Michel and Chab then met Amanda, who was to become their new singer on subsequent albums.

Discography

Albums
 I Refuse To Grow Up (2001)
 I Was Born Ready Baby, Yeah!
 Walk That Walk
 (Tapping) The Source
 Innerlude
 Poison In My Veins (Part 1 & 2)
 One Love, One Revolution
 Poison In My Veins (JP Cristal Dark Remix)
 Of The Influence Of Fall On Music And Its Overall Consequences On The Youth's State Of Mind
 I Refuse To Remix (2002)
 I Blue it (Jack Lahana remix)
 Rocknroll (Alex Gopher remix)
 Walk that Walk (Lowkick remix)
 Reindeer Show The Way (2004)
 Communication's Lost
 The Servant
 Sparks
 Hey You!
 So As A Gentleman You Should Be More Polite
 Daisy's Face
 Easy Terms
 Le Fusible
 (How High) Can You Fly?
 #1 (In Your Heart)
 What's Left Of Us
 Sailing Home
 We Were A Trio (2005)
 Bowing Oceans By
 Drizzling Not Dazzling
 Nutopia
 Bam! Tululu!
 Did You Ever See
 090105
 We Were A Trio
 Courtyard
 Mocking Stars
 Two Cannot Be
 Charlotte's On Fire EP (2007)
 Charlotte's On Fire
 Minefield
 Guess I'm Dumb
 Charlotte's On Fire (Bot'Ox Remix)
 Charlotte's On Fire (Nouvelle Vague Remix)
 Cinders (Origami Birö Remix)
 It Ain't Hip (To Be Labeled A Hippie)
 We'll Drive Home Backwards (2008)
 You Are My Sunshine
 Charlotte's On Fire
 Twilight Zone
 Cinders
 Rec74
 Suffragettes
 My My My
 Lady In Waiting
 Oh Ruby Sun
 Athletes!
 Polly (Has My Disease)
 The Verve Were Right
 Broken Glass
 Your Blue (hidden track)

Singles
 Easy Terms (2004)
 Bam! Tululu! (2005)
 Did You Ever See (2005)
 Charlotte On Fire (2007)

Others 

 Pointing Excitedly To The Sky (2006)
 Communication's Lost
 Bam! Tululu!
 The Servant
 Sparks
 Did You Ever See
 Drizzling Yet Dazzling
 We Were A Trio
 Easy Terms
 Nutopia
 Daisy's Face
 090105
 So As A Gentleman You Should Be More Polite
 What's Left Of Us?
 The Man Who Sold The World
 Charllote In Fire

This United Kingdom release, is a combination of the two previous albums.

Compilations
 Ryūichi Sakamoto's iTunes playlist - (Tapping) The Source
 The In-Laws Original Soundtrack (2003) - Innerlude
 Park Hyatt Tokyo: Air Flow (2004) - (Tapping) The Source (different version than that on I refuse to grow up)
 Nova Tunes 1.1 (2005) - The Servant
 Bowie Mania (2007) - The Man Who Sold The World (previously unreleased)

External links
 Official website
 Official MySpace

French electronic music groups